Another Mayberry is the first studio album by Colorado rock band Big Head Todd and the Monsters, released in 1989.  The album was released on the band's own Big Records, which also released their second album Midnight Radio the following year.

After the success of the band's third album and first major label effort Sister Sweetly, Warner Bros. Records re-released Another Maybery in 1994.

Track listing
All songs written by Todd Park Mohr.
"Flander's Fields" – 4:03
"Another Mayberry" – 2:51
"Salvation" – 4:38
"I Will Carry" – 3:12
"Blues for Annie" – 3:26
"Blue Water" – 3:29
"Geography of a Horse Dreamer" – 4:09
"It All Comes Down" – 2:54
"American Boy" – 4:20
"Waiting in America" – 3:36
"Hymn" – 3:58

References

1989 debut albums
Big Head Todd and the Monsters albums